Robert Vernon may refer to:

 Robert Vernon (musician) (born 1949), classical violist and teacher
 Robert Vernon, 1st Baron Lyveden (1800–1873), British politician, MP for Tralee, and for Northampton
 Robert Vernon (MP for Shropshire) (1577–1625), English landowner, courtier and politician
 Robert Vernon (art patron) (1774–1849), English contractor, businessman and patron of art
 Robert Vernon (The Boys), a character in the comic book series The Boys